Golpe has multiple meanings, as described below:
 In music, golpe can mean
golpe (guitar technique) is a Flamenco guitar technique where one uses the fingers to tap on the soundboard of the guitar, from the Spanish golpe, meaning to strike;
golpe (cuatro pattern), the percussive strummed patterns of the cuatro.
 In politics, golpe can mean a coup d'état, from the Spanish term golpe de estado.
 In heraldry, golpe is a purple (purpure) roundel.